Alfonso Carvajal is a writer and editor born in Cartagena, Colombia in 1958.

Works
 El desencanto de la eternidad
 Memoria de la noche
 Un minuto de silencio
 Los poetas malditos, un ensayo libre de culpa

He also reviews books in the newspaper El Tiempo. As an editor, he has published works by Aurelio Arturo, Germán Espinosa and Rafael Gutiérrez Girardot, among others.

Bibliography
 
 Analisis De Ana Karenina,  Panamericana Pub Llc,

References

1958 births
Living people
Colombian male writers